Infierno en el paraíso (English title: Hell in paradise) is a Mexican telenovela produced by Carlos Sotomayor for Televisa in 1999.

Alicia Machado and Juan Ferrara starred as protagonists, while Julieta Rosen, Diana Bracho, Julio Bracho and Rafael del Villar starred as antagonists. Héctor Suárez Gomis, Itatí Cantoral and the leading actors Silvia Derbez, Magda Guzmán Rosa María Bianchi, Sergio Corona, Arsenio Campos and Elsa Cárdenas starred as stellar performances.

Cast 
 
Alicia Machado as Marian Ordiales
Juan Ferrara as Alejandro Valdivia
Diana Bracho as Dariana Valdivia
Julieta Rosen as Fernanda Prego de Valdivia
Julio Bracho as Antonio Valdivia
Héctor Suárez Gomis as Ricardo Selma
Magda Guzmán as Fernanda "Nanda" Vda. de Prego
Silvia Derbez as Angélica Vda. de Clemente
Itatí Cantoral as Francesca Paoli Prado
Rosa María Bianchi as Dolores Almada de Fernandez
Arsenio Campos as Santiago
Elizabeth Aguilar as Connie
Sergio Corona as Father Juan
Tony Bravo as Javier
Roxana Castellanos as Janet
Sharis Cid as Claudia Fernandez Almada
Elsa Cárdenas as Elsa
Consuelo Mendiola as Laura Fernandez Almada
Aurora Molina as Herminia
Paco Ibáñez as Federico Ordiales
Archie Lafranco as Paul Rivers
Israel Jaitovich as Gerardo
Arturo Laphan as Fermín
Sebastián Moncayo as Gustavo
Fernando Moya as Pancho
María Prado as Doña Mary
Mariana Sánchez as Lucina
Rafael del Villar as Lic. Villanueva
Marlene Favela as Patricia
Amparo Garrido as Amparo
Marco Uriel as Dr. Héctor Lapuente
Manola Diez as Azela
Alejandro Ávila as Felipe
Martha Aline as Cecilia
Elia Domenzain as Chela
Francisco Avendaño as Genaro
Ignacio Guadalupe as Poncho

References

External links

1999 telenovelas
Mexican telenovelas
1999 Mexican television series debuts
1999 Mexican television series endings
Spanish-language telenovelas
Television shows set in Mexico
Televisa telenovelas